The list of shipwrecks in 1987 includes ships sunk, foundered, grounded, or otherwise lost during 1987.

January

4 January

14 January

16 January

28 January

February

1 February

4 February

6 February

8 February

20 February

March

4 March

6 March

8 March

15 March

16 March

20 March

21 March

April

4 April

8 April

16 April

21 April

28 April

May

1 May

5 May

6 May

27 May

June

11 June

12 June

15 June

16 June

19 June

29 June

July

2 July

16 July

17 July

22 July

25 July

28 July

29 July

Unknown date

August

13 August

17 August

26 August

September

10 September

16 September

19 September

26 September

October

1 October

16 October

November

5 November

7 November

14 November

27 November

28 November

30 November

December

5 December

7 December

8 December

10 December

12 December

20 December

24 December

31 December

Unknown date

References 

1987
 
Ship